Litsea nemoralis is a species of plant in the family Lauraceae. It is endemic to Sri Lanka.

References

nemoralis
Endemic flora of Sri Lanka
Endangered flora of Asia
Taxonomy articles created by Polbot